Jaume Masià Vargas (born 31 October 2000) is a Spanish motorcycle rider, currently competing in the Moto3 World Championship for Leopard Racing.

Career

Between 2015 and 2017 Masia competed in the FIM CEV Moto3 Junior Championships finishing 2nd overall to Dennis Foggia in his final season. He previously competed in the 2014 Red Bull Rookies Cup.

Masia made his Moto3 World Championship debut as a replacement for the injured Darryn Binder during the 2017 season. In his first ever Grand Prix he managed to set a fastest lap.

Career statistics

Red Bull MotoGP Rookies Cup

Races by year
(key) (Races in bold indicate pole position, races in italics indicate fastest lap)

FIM CEV Moto3 Junior World Championship

Races by year
(key) (Races in bold indicate pole position, races in italics indicate fastest lap)

Grand Prix motorcycle racing

By season

By class

Races by year
(key) (Races in bold indicate pole position, races in italics indicate fastest lap)

References

External links

2000 births
Living people
Spanish motorcycle racers
Moto3 World Championship riders
People from Ribera Alta (comarca)
Sportspeople from the Province of Valencia